List of The Odd Couple episodes may refer to:
 List of The Odd Couple (1970 TV series) episodes, episode list of the 1970-1975 ABC sitcom
 List of The Odd Couple (2015 TV series) episodes, episode list of the 2015-2017 CBS sitcom

See also 
 Odd Couple (disambiguation)